The Fitzroy Baseball Club, known as the Fitzroy Lions, is a baseball club founded in 1889 to represent the inner Melbourne suburb of Fitzroy, Victoria.  The club was a founding member of the Victorian Baseball League, Victoria's first organised baseball competition.  Fitzroy has won 16 Division 1 championships and currently has seven senior men's teams, one women's team and a masters team competing in the Baseball Victoria Summer League, as well as junior sides representing the club at every age level.

Early history

The Fitzroy Baseball Club was founded by the Fitzroy Cricket Club in 1889, the cricket club also founded the Fitzroy Football Club, Tennis Club and Bowls Club.  The first intimation to form a baseball club was received by the committee from Mr E. Glass on 20 May 1889, and it was resolved at the next committee meeting to form a team in connection with the club.

Fitzroy was a foundation member of the Victorian Baseball League which was formed under the guidance of Harry Simpson in March 1889. The other foundation teams were; Victoria, MCC, Fitzroy, Richmond, Richmond Cricket Club, Ferguson, Mitchell, The Age, St Kilda, Malvern, Carlton, South Melbourne, East Melbourne, Metropolitans, Essendon and Blackburn.

Several notable cricketers played for Fitzroy early in the club's history including cricketer Bill Ponsford who played for Fitzroy from 1913 to 1934 and the Harvey brothers (Neil Harvey, Merv Harvey, Mick Harvey, Ray Harvey, Harold Harvey and Brian Harvey) who played from the 1930s to the 1960s.

Recent history

2009/10: Division 2 club champions
Fitzroy Baseball Club had a fantastic season winning the Baseball Victoria's Division 2 Club Championship Award and gaining promotion to division 1.  The club championship reflected the club's depth throughout all grades, after the home and away season the 1sts finished second, the 2nds finished on top of the ladder, the 3rds went undefeated throughout the season, the 4ths finished second and the 5ths finished fifth; resulting in three premierships.  The award was a fitting tribute to the 120 year anniversary of the club.

2015/16: Division 2 runners up and promotion to division 1
Fitzroy were runners up in the division 2 grand final to Moorabbin Baseball Club earning promotion to division 1 for the 2016/17 season.  Taylor Eichhorst won the Division 2 home run championship and John Peterson was honoured as the Baseball Victoria Coach of the Year for his work coaching the lions back into division 1.

2016/17: Division 1 club champions
In the club's first year back in division 1 it won the club championship  and made the first division 1 finals appearance for the firsts since 1961.  Following the Christmas break Fitzroy's firsts strung together ten consecutive victories to surge into playoff contention, bowing out in the conference playoff against Essendon.  Josh Tols starred on the mound with a 0.20 ERA winning the league's best pitcher award and new club coach Tom Dicker was a standout with the bat, finishing with a 0.421 batting average (the 3rd best in the league ) and a 0.513 OBA.  Four Fitzroy players were also recognised in the league allstar team Alex Turlea, Josh Tols, Tom Dicker and Zach Rhodes 

In a great year for the club the 1sts, 2nds, 4ths and 5ths all made it into the playoffs helping to secure the club championship, with the 2nds winning the grand final 6-4 against Waverley making it back to back premierships for the team.

Notable players

Bill Ponsford

William Harold "Bill" Ponsford MBE (19 October 1900 – 6 April 1991) started his baseball career at Alfred Crescent School (now Fitzroy North Primary School), where his coach was the former Victorian player Charles Landsdown. As a junior Ponsford played shortstop, later as a senior for the Fitzroy Baseball Club he converted to catching.  Ponsford was a key member of the all conquering 1920's Fitzroy Maroons, captaining the club to its historic 1925 premiership, the Club's fifth consecutive Division 1 premiership.

Ponsford improved rapidly and by 1913 he was included in the Victorian schoolboys side for a tournament in Adelaide. He was again selected in the following year—now as a catcher—representing his state at the first national schoolboys championship in Sydney. The tournament coincided with a visit to Australia by two professional major league teams from the United States—the Chicago White Sox and the New York Giants. The manager of the Giants, John "Mugsy" McGraw, watched part of the tournament; the Ponsford family claim that McGraw was so impressed with Ponsford's skills that he later spoke to Ponsford's parents about the possibility of Bill playing in the United States.

In 1919, Ponsford was selected for Victoria's baseball team, alongside future Test cricket teammate Jack Ryder. In 1923, The Sporting Globe claimed that Ponsford was "... the best batter of the season. ... Indeed, as an all-round man, it is doubtful if he has a superior in the state." In 1925, Ponsford captained the Victorian team and was selected as centre fielder in an Australian representative team that played three matches against an outfit from the United States Pacific Fleet, which had docked in Melbourne. Over the three matches, won by the Australians, Ponsford had five safe hits and his batting average was .357. Ponsford's next match against American opposition was against a team from Stanford University that visited Australia in 1927. Ponsford's Victorian team defeated Stanford 5–3; it was the visitors' only loss on the tour.

Ponsford simultaneously retired from baseball and cricket in 1934. In his newspaper column, he said that he liked both sports equally. He felt that baseball gave a player more opportunities to perform: "In cricket you may have the bad luck to get out early; which often means a blank afternoon. It is not so with baseball; you are in the game all the time." Joe Clark, the author of History of Australian Baseball, said "Ponsford is considered by many to be the best baseballer of his time in Australia." The official program for the 1952 Claxton Shield—held in Perth—made a similar claim.

Graeme Deany 
Graeme started playing cricket at Fitzroy Cricket Club as a 13-year-old in 1949.  At the cricket club Ray Harvey noticed his athletic ability, throwing and fielding and invited Graeme to join the Fitzroy Baseball Club where he started as a 16-year-old in the seconds in 1953 (there were no junior teams at the time).  Graeme started playing baseball at left field and for 2 seasons at Fitzroy played alongside Neil Harvey at center field and his younger brother Ian Deany at right field. After those first two seasons he moved into the infield playing shortstop and 3rd base for the rest of his career at the top level of baseball.

Graeme played baseball for Fitzroy from 1953 to 1962 and then 1964 to 1965.  After one season of baseball he was selected on the bench for the club's 1954 A-grade Grand final victory against St Kilda 6-4 at the Junction Oval. In 1963 he moved to Footscray as captain / coach and then returned to Fitzroy to captain / coach in 1964 and 1965. Finally in 1966 he moved to Ivanhoe and coached them to a C grade premiership.

Graeme was a member of the Victorian Claxton Shield Team for 11 consecutive years (from 1956 to 1966), winning the Claxton Shield 4 times playing at SS and 3rd Base and playing in 72 of 74 possible games. He was selected in the Australian team 9 times and 7 years in a row from 1957 to 1963, an Australian record at the time. He won the Helms award in 1965 for the best player of the Australian championships, the first Victorian to win the Helms award.

Australian Baseball Hall of Fame

 Graeme Deany – inducted 2005

Helms Award winners
The 'Helms' award is arguably Australian baseball's most prestigious individual award.  Since 1962 the 'Helms' award has been awarded each year to the most outstanding player of the Claxton Shield competition (Australian baseball's annual national tournament).  The following Fitzroy Baseball club players have won the award:

 Graeme Deany – 1965

Baseball Victoria life members
 John King – inducted 2015

International / national representatives

Australian team

Bill Ponsford – 1920's
Neil Harvey – 1946
Ray Harvey – 1948
Graeme Deany – 1957, 1958, 1959, 1960, 1961, 1962, 1963, 1965, 1966
Josh Tols – 2017 World Baseball Classic

Victorian team

Bill Ponsford – 1919, 1920 1922, 1927
 H Lansdown – 1922, 1927
 A Dummett – 1927
 Alan Logan – 1930s
 Tom Ruddell – 1934
 Ted Melling – 1934
 Howard Parkin – 1936 (captain)
 McCarthy – 1938
 J Plant – 1938, 1939 (captain coach)
Merv Harvey – 1940s
Neil Harvey – 1946, 1950, 1951
 Mick Harvey – 1940–50s
Ray Harvey – 1947, 1948, 1949, 1950, 1951
 Brian Harvey – 1940–50s
 Don Arnall – 1952
 Keith Cant – 1950, 1951, 1952
 J. Knight – 1950, 1952
 A. McLean – 1951, 1952
 Neil Turl – 1956
 Glen Tippett – 1950, 1951, 1952, 1956
 Graeme Deany – 1956, 1957, 1958, 1959, 1960, 1961, 1962, 1963, 1964, 1965, 1966

Melbourne Aces
Fitzroy has had several clubmen represent the Melbourne Aces playing professional baseball in the Australian Baseball League, including:

 Jamie Lethborg – 2011/12
 John Edwards – 2011/12
 Adam Rowe – 2012/13
 Josh Tols – 2016-2019

Legends & life members

Club legends

 Graham Moss
 John King
 Norm McHenry
 Jim Bolkas
 Graeme Deany
 Laurie Mazzocato
 Edward Sedgman

Life members

Club honour roll

Home ground at Merri Park
In 1883, Charles McCarthy, an Irish-born doctor, opened a Melbourne Retreat for the Cure of Inebriates on 32 acres on St. Georges Rd that is now largely occupied by Northcote High School and Merri Park.

In the early 1900s the growing Fitzroy Cricket Club (the original parent club of the Fitzroy Baseball Club) was in need of an additional field for its teams to play on.  To develop a solution the club arranged a meeting on 17 August 1909 between the Mayor of Northcote, the Mayor of Fitzroy, Councillors from both cities, the committee of the Fitzroy Cricket Club and the Minister for Lands Mr McKenzie.  The Cricket Club urged that the 10 acres of the Crown land known as the Inebriates' Retreat, at Northcote, be sold to the Club for recreation purposes at a nominal price.  The Minister promised to take the matter to the Cabinet and the outcome was the following letter :

The ground was used by the Club as an adjunct ground from 1910 with the club undertaking a number of improvements together with the Northcote Council.  In 1912 with the help of the Fitzroy Council the cricket club filled in the unused watercourse that crossed the park with 4,000 square yards of filling.

In 1914 considerable improvements were made by the Cricket Club with the pavilion re-erected and caretakers quarters added as well as a 4 ft 3in picket fence being erected along the length of the western and southern boundaries of the field to prevent cricket balls going into the Merri Creek so often.  The improvements made by the club up to 1914 totalled £750, including the filling of the storm water channel.

In 1915 the club continued to make improvements in order to fulfil the terms of the land grant, the pavilion was re-painted, the water supply was laid to the park and the showers connected proving a great convenience to players.

In 1927 Merri Park was made into a permanent reserve after the Minister of Lands allowed the Education Department to use part of the reserve for Northcote High School.

During the 2011–12 summer season Merri Park was resurfaced and underwent a warm weather turf conversion to protect it from the drought conditions which had seen it become a dust bowl in previous years.  Fitzroy relocated for the majority of the season to Elder St Reserve, Greensborough Baseball Club's winter ground.

Club song

To the tune of "La Marseillaise"

We are the boys from old Fitzroy,
We wear the colours maroon and blue,
We will always strive for victory,
We will always see it through.
Win or lose we do or die,
And in defeat we always try,
Fitzroy Fitzroy the team we love so dear,
Premiers we'll be this year.

See also
Baseball Victoria
Baseball Victoria Summer League

References

Books

External links
Official website

1889 establishments in Australia
Baseball teams established in 1889
Sports clubs established in 1889
Australian baseball clubs
Baseball teams in Melbourne
Fitzroy, Victoria
Sport in the City of Yarra